Definition is the sixth album by the American crossover thrash band D.R.I. It was released in 1992.

The band supported the album by touring with Testament.

Critical reception

The Arizona Daily Star wrote that D.R.I.'s "combined fire is stoked by a thrash-metal style and controlled by a social conscience."

Track listing

Bonus tracks
LP – "Out of Mind"
Cassette – "Hide Your Eyes"
CD – "Dry Heaves"

Credits
 Kurt Brecht –  vocals
 Spike Cassidy –  guitars
 John Menor –  bass
 Rob Rampy – drums

References

D.R.I. (band) albums
1992 albums